Mount Olivet Baptist Church or Mt. Olivet Baptist Church may be:

Mt. Olivet Baptist Church (Portland, Oregon)
Mt. Olivet Baptist Church (Harlem, New York)

See also
Mount Olive Baptist Church (disambiguation)